Simms is an unincorporated community in Bowie County, Texas, United States. According to the Handbook of Texas, the community had a population of 240 in 2000. It is part of the Texarkana metropolitan area.

History
Simms was named for G.W. Simms, who helped establish a post office in the community in 1890. Two years later, the community developed a gristmill, a gin, and a store alongside a population of 50. It grew to 150 in 1914 and returned to 50 in the 1930s. It continued to grow into the next decade and had four businesses in 1982. The population jumped to 240 at that time and remained at that level through 2000.

Geography

Climate
The climate in this area is characterized by hot, humid summers and generally mild to cool winters. According to the Köppen Climate Classification system, Simms has a humid subtropical climate, abbreviated "Cfa" on climate maps.

Education
The Simms Independent School District serves area students.

Notable person
 Rac Slider, retired baseball infielder and coach for the Boston Red Sox, was born in Simms.

References

Unincorporated communities in Texas
Unincorporated communities in Bowie County, Texas
Texarkana metropolitan area